Fåberg Station is a former railway station on the Dovre Line, located at Fåberg in Lillehammer, Norway. Until 1924, it was called Faaberg.

References

Railway stations in Oppland
Railway stations on the Dovre Line
Railway stations opened in 1894
Disused railway stations in Norway

Year of disestablishment missing